Merengue can refer to:

Merengue music
Merengue (dance)
Merengue típico, a musical genre of the Dominican Republic

An adjective referring to the Real Madrid football club
An adjective referring to Club Universitario de Deportes
Merengue (band), a Japanese rock band
"Merengue", a song by American rapper Kent Jones

See also
Meringue, a type of French dessert (which is spelled merengue in Spanish) 
Méringue, a musical genre native to Haiti